The Star of Courage (SC) is a bravery decoration awarded to Australians. It is awarded for acts of conspicuous courage in circumstances of great peril. The SC was created on 14 February 1975. The decoration recognises acts of bravery by members of the community. They selflessly put themselves in jeopardy to protect the lives or property of others. It is ranked second in the Australian civil bravery decorations in the Australian Honours System. Recipients of the Star of Courage are entitled to use the post-nominal letters "SC".

Description

Medal
The Star of Courage is a silver, ribbed star with seven points ensigned with the Crown of Saint Edward. The obverse has the shield and crest of the Commonwealth Coat of Arms surmounted by a Federation Star.

Ribbon and bar
A suspender bar is engraved with the words For Courage. The 32mm medal ribbon is dark red with a central magenta band of 14mm width, representing the colours of venous and arterial blood.

Decoration allowance
Section 102 of the Veterans’ Entitlements Act 1986 (VEA) provides for the payment of an allowance called “decoration allowance” to a veteran who is in receipt of a disability pension under the VEA and who was awarded the Star of Courage for gallantry during a war or warlike operations covered by the VEA. At March 2008, this tax free allowance was A$2.10 per fortnight.

See also
Australian Honours Order of Precedence
List of recipients of the Star of Courage

References

External links
Star of Courage Fact Sheet, Australian Bravery Association. Also at It's an Honour
The Australian Honours Secretariat, www.gg.gov.au

Civil awards and decorations of Australia
Courage awards

1975 establishments in Australia
Awards established in 1975